The Serie B 1998–99 was the sixty-seventh tournament of this competition played in Italy since its creation.

Teams
Cesena, Cremonese, Cosenza and Ternana had been promoted from Serie C, while Brescia, Atalanta, Lecce and Napoli had been relegated from Serie A.

Final classification

Results

Serie B seasons
2
Italy